The 1996–97 Washington Capitals season was the team's 23rd season of play. The Capitals finished fifth in the division, and ninth in the conference, and failed to make the playoffs for the first time since 1982. It was their last full season playing at USAir Arena.

Regular season

Final standings

Schedule and results

Player statistics

Regular season
Scoring

Goaltending

Note: GP = Games played; G = Goals; A = Assists; Pts = Points; +/- = Plus/minus; PIM = Penalty minutes; PPG=Power-play goals; SHG=Short-handed goals; GWG=Game-winning goals
      MIN=Minutes played; W = Wins; L = Losses; T = Ties; GA = Goals against; GAA = Goals against average; SO = Shutouts; SA=Shots against; SV=Shots saved; SV% = Save percentage;

Draft picks
Washington's draft picks at the 1996 NHL Entry Draft held at the Kiel Center in St. Louis, Missouri.

See also
 1996–97 NHL season

References
 

W
W
Washington Capitals seasons
Cap
Cap